Pierre Elliott Trudeau High School (commonly known as PETHS, PET, or Trudeau) is a public, bilingual English and French-immersion secondary school in Markham, Ontario. It was named in honour of the 15th Prime Minister of Canada, the Right Honourable Pierre Elliott Trudeau.

History
Construction of Pierre Elliott Trudeau HS commenced in June 2001 and opened the following September 2002 with 500 students in grade 7, 8, 9 and 10.  The grade 7 and 8 students were from Castlemore Public School, a designated feeder school, and were segregated from the high school students.  The Class of 2005 was the first graduating class of Pierre Elliott Trudeau HS.

Location and feeder schools
Located in northern Markham between Major Mackenzie Dr. and 16th Avenue on Kennedy and Bur Oak Avenue, Trudeau is a part of the York Region District School Board, Trudeau primarily serves students who reside in northern Unionville, which include the communities of Cachet, Angus Glen, and Berczy Village. Trudeau also serves students in the French-immersion program who reside in the communities of Stouffville, and most of the City of Markham. During the school year of 2017-2018, the opening of Bill Hogarth Secondary School resulted in mandatory transfers from approximately half of the French immersion students at Trudeau.

PETHS's feeder schools include:
 Ashton Meadows P.S.
 Beckett Farm P.S.
 Castlemore P.S.
 Stonebridge P.S.
Milliken Mills P.S. (French Immersion)
 Sir Wilfrid Laurier P.S. (French Immersion)

Academics
PETHS was intended to be an academic school from the onset.  Initially upon opening, Trudeau hired many teachers from Bayview Secondary School with the intent of implementing the International Baccalaureate program, which as of 2021 had not yet been achieved.  The school is slowly phasing out the AP program, though exams can still be written. AP courses are no longer offered. In addition, Trudeau now offers a Specialist High Skills Major in business, health & wellness, arts & culture and information computer technology.

The 2015 Fraser Institute Report Card on Secondary Schools gives PET the following ranking:

Music

Trudeau Music, (often stylized as "trudeaumusic") is the music department at PETHS. Starting in 2002, the department has grown considerably and now consists of more than 700 students. Over the years, Trudeau Music has traveled to New York City, Chicago, and Washington D.C. The department has previously invited composers such as Samuel Hazo, Frank Ticheli, Elliot del Borgo, Robert Sheldon, Stephen Bulla, Doctor Andrew Boysen Jr., Doc Severinsen and clinicians such as Paula Holcomb to work with students. Trudeau Music is also the first school in Canadian history to have won 8 Gold Awards at MusicFest Canada.

Courses
Trudeau Music offers a wide selection of courses available for students, including:

Instrumental Band & Repertoire (Grades 9-12)

These courses offer students the opportunity to participate in their own concert band and hone their musical talents. Repertoire courses (consisting of full ensemble rehearsals) occur after school-hours. The Repertoire course is recommended as a co-requisite with this course.

Vocals & Repertoire (Grades 9-12)

In a choir setting, Trudeau Music's Vocal Courses train students' musical abilities. The Repertoire course is included as a co-requisite with this course.

Strings & Repertoire (Grades 9-12)

Students are able to develop their skills by playing in their own string orchestra. The String Courses are divided into two separate ones: one being "Junior Strings", for musicians in Grade 9, and "Senior Strings", featuring students from Grades 10 and up. The Repertoire course is included as a co-requisite with both courses.

Guitar (Grade 11)

Trudeau Music's own Guitar Course trains and enriches students' guitar playing skills and technique.

Musical Theatre (Grades 10-12)

This course at Trudeau Music teaches students the fundamentals of musical theatre and gives them the chance to perform in their very own stage production at the end of the school year. Previously a club, the class was started in the 2017-2018 school year.

Concerts
Trudeau Music hosts 3 annual concerts throughout the school year:

A Celebration of Bands

"A Celebration of Bands", also known as the Trudeau Band Workshop Concert, or simply TBW, is an annual event which showcases Trudeau Music students from Pierre Elliott Trudeau High School performing, as well as featuring multiple other YRDSB elementary school's bands who display their own talents as musicians. "A Celebration of Bands" also features collaborations with the University of Toronto's Wind Symphony.

Winter Melodies

"Winter Melodies" is the Music department's annual Holiday concert, with shows featured at Trudeau until the year 2012, when the department now presents the show at the famed FLATO Markham Theatre. The concert features multiple wind and string ensembles, the Trudeau Singers, as well as including performances from jazz bands and the Musical Theatre cast from Trudeau.

Spring Harmonies

"Spring Harmonies" serves as Trudeau Music's Spring Show and end-of-the-year performance. Likewise to "Winter Melodies", shows were held on site at Trudeau until 2012, when performances are now being held at the FLATO Markham Theatre.

Trudeau Music Council
The Trudeau Music Council consists of 32 students from Grade 9 through 12 who collaborate to produce Trudeau Music's numerous concerts and social events, such as the annual Fall potluck and Music Banquet at the end of the school year. Members of the Council also aid in representing their own ensemble as well as conceiving promotional videos, keeping records, and improving overall student life in the Music Department from late September to early June.

Awards and recognition

National recognition

Trudeau Music is the first department in Canadian history to win 6 Gold Awards at the National finals for the Concert Band Division of MusicFest Canada (2015) and 8 golds overall.

Ontario Band Association (Concert Band Festival)

Wind ensembles from Trudeau Music have won numerous Gold ratings and awards for outstanding achievement in performance.

Kiwanis Music Festival

Over the years, Trudeau Music has been awarded multiple 1st place and "Best in Class" awards. In June 2016, Trudeau Music's Grade 10 Symphonic Band achieved 1st place in the province.
In 2018, Trudeau's Grade 9 Concert Band won Platinum with a best in class performance.

School events

Academic
PETHS has historically participated in and excelled at the McMaster University Engineering Olympics, winning in multiple events. Since 2005, they have participated in the York Region Science Olympics and have ranked in the top 7. Since 2004, its students began entering the University of Toronto Biology Contest  and have placed in the top third of all international schools to participate. The school also regularly participates in the Sir Isaac Newton Physics Contest, and all applicable University of Waterloo Canadian Mathematics Competition.  Trudeau's music department has advanced to the Gold Level at the OBA competitions. PETHS's Computer Science Club has won the YRDSB ECOO Programming Competition for 2016 and 2017.

Student Council
Trudeau Student Activity Council (often simplified to 'TSAC') is an extracurricular club whose main role concerns managing all the other clubs at the school. It is  composed of students from all grades. In 2016, a new position, "Equity Chair" was added to enhance the diversity at PETHS. Events held by the Student Council include Trudeaumania, a welcoming event for grade nine students; Blazer's Bash which is a school wide event taking place near the end of May; as well as many school spirit days usually focused on Spirit week in the late winter before March Break.

See also
 List of high schools in Ontario

References

External links

 Pierre Elliott Trudeau High School website
 YRDSB Information Website

York Region District School Board
High schools in the Regional Municipality of York
Buildings and structures in Markham, Ontario
Pierre Trudeau
Educational institutions established in 2002
2002 establishments in Ontario